The Association of Polish Electrical Engineers (Stowarzyszenie Elektryków Polskich, SEP; also called Association of Polish Electricians) is a Polish non-governmental organisation integrating the community of electricians of Polish origin worldwide. The organisation brings together both engineers and technicians, as well as young students (pupils of technical and vocational schools) in electrical engineering in the broadest sense.

Activities 
SEP is mainly involved in education activities (training courses for the operation of electrical equipment). It is also involved in conformity assessment of low-voltage electrical products (since 1933), through its office of quality, an SEP agency with national accreditations and recognition from the most prestigious international and European organisations. It also carries out extensive international cooperation under the English name of "Association of Polish Electrical Engineers". It is a member of the National Federation of Scientific and Technical Associations of Poland and the European organisation EUREL.

History 
From 7 to 9 June 1919, a congress was held to establish the Association of Polish Electrical Engineers. Professor Mieczysław Pożaryski was elected its first president. In 1928 the organisation merged with the Association of Polish Radio Engineers, and in 1929 the name was changed to its present name by a decision of the board of directors. In 1939, the Association of Polish Telecommunication Engineers joined SEP.

Presidents 
 1919–1928 – Mieczysław Pożaryski (first president of the SEP)
 1928–1929 – Kazimierz Straszewski
 1929–1930 – Zygmunt Okoniewski
 1930–1931 – Kazimierz Straszewski
 1931–1932 – Felicjan Karśnicki
 1932–1933 – Tadeusz Czaplicki
 1933–1934 – Alfons Kühn
 1934–1935 – Jan Obrąpalski
 1935–1936 – Alfons Kühn
 1936–1937 – Janusz Groszkowski
 1937–1938 – Alfons Hoffmann
 1938–1939 – Kazimierz Szpotański
 1939 – Antoni Krzyczkowski
 1939–1946 – Kazimierz Szpotański
 1946–1947 – Kazimierz Straszewski
 1947–1949 – Włodzimierz Szumilin
 1949–1950 – Stanisław Ignatowicz
 1950–1951 – Tadeusz Żarnecki
 1951–1952 – Jerzy Lando
 1952–1959 – Kazimierz Kolbiński
 1959–1961 – Tadeusz Kahl
 1961–1981 – Tadeusz Dryzek
 1981–1987 – Jacek Szpotański
 1987–1990 – Bohdan Paszkowski
 1990–1994 – Jacek Szpotański
 1994–1998 – Cyprian Brudkowski
 1998–2002 – Stanisław Bolkowski
 2002–2006 – Stanisław Bolkowski
 2006–2014 – Jerzy Barglik
 2014–2022 – Piotr Szymczak
 from 2022 – Sławomir Cieślik

References

External links
Official Website

Professional associations based in Poland
Certification marks
Standards organisations in Poland
Product-testing organizations
1919 establishments in Poland
Organizations established in 1919
Organisations based in Warsaw